Elizabeth Zane McLaughlin Clark (July 19, 1765 – August 23, 1823) was a heroine of the Revolutionary War on the American frontier. She was the daughter of William Andrew Zane and Nancy Ann (née Nolan) Zane, and the sister of Ebenezer Zane, Silas Zane, Jonathan Zane, Isaac Zane and Andrew Zane.

Biography
Three of the Zane brothers — Ebenezer, Silas and Jonathan — migrated from present-day Moorefield, Hardy County, [West] Virginia in 1769 and founded the first settlement at present-day Wheeling, Ohio County, West Virginia.  The rest of the Zane family later joined them at the new settlement.

According to a historical marker in Wheeling, on September 11, 1782, the Zane family was under siege in Fort Henry by Native American allies of the British. During the siege, while Betty was loading a Kentucky rifle, her father was wounded and fell from the top of the fort right in front of her. The captain of the fort said, "We have lost two men, one Mr. Zane and another gentleman, and we need black gunpowder."

Betty's family home was where the gunpowder store was for Fort Henry's defense. So Betty ran 40 to 50 yards to retrieve gunpowder, then returned safely. They held off the Native Americans and lived.

The Zane family later settled in what became Martins Ferry, Belmont County, Ohio, across the Ohio River from Wheeling, and played an important role during Ohio's formative years.

The Siege of Fort Henry 

In 1782 Native American and Loyalist forces attacked the small garrison of Fort Henry (modern-day Wheeling, West Virginia) which was being defended by forty-two men under the command of Colonel David Shepherd of the Ohio Militia.  When the garrison ran low on ammunition (black powder), Zane volunteered to leave the garrison to retrieve more ammunition from her brother's home nearby.  Zane's actions are credited with allowing the defenders to continue to hold the fort, which remained under American control.

Personal life

Elizabeth "Betty" Zane was married twice and was a mother of nine children.

Before her first marriage, she bore a daughter, Minerva Catherine Zane, also known as Miriam, by one Capt. Van Swearingen. Court records in Ohio County, Virginia, show an order for Van Swearingen to deed property to Betty Zane, so the daughter would be provided for and not become a burden on the county.

Zane's first husband was Ephraim McLaughlin with whom she had four daughters; Mary Ann "Polly", Sarah Nancy, Rebecca and Hannah McLaughlin.  After the death of her first husband, she married Jacob Clark with whom she had a son, Ebenezer Clark, and a daughter, Catherine Clark.

Zane's date of birth was July 19, 1765, and she died on August 23, 1823.

She was buried in what is now the Walnut Grove Pioneer Cemetery in Martins Ferry, Ohio.  Her heroism is remembered each year during Betty Zane Pioneer Days.

Legacy

The community of Betty Zane near Wheeling, West Virginia, was named after her.

More than one hundred years after her death, John S. Adams wrote a poem called "Elizabeth Zane" that achieved some acclaim.

Betty Zane's great-grandnephew, the author Zane Grey, wrote a historical novel about her, titled Betty Zane, also republished as The Last Ranger. One of the main events in the story is the tale of Zane's fetching supplies from the family cabin.  When Grey could not find a publisher for the book, he published it himself in 1903 using his wife's money. Grey later named his daughter Betty Zane after his famous aunt.

See also
Siege of Fort Henry (1782)

References

External links
Electronic editions of Betty Zane by Zane Grey
 Betty Zane by Zane Grey on Wikisource
 
 

Other links
Elizabeth Zane chapter of the Daughters of the American Revolution

Women in the American Revolution
West Virginia colonial people
People of Virginia in the American Revolution
1765 births
1823 deaths
People of pre-statehood West Virginia
People from Martins Ferry, Ohio
West Virginia pioneers
Ohio pioneers